The 2017–18 Dutch Basketball League (DBL) was the 58th season of the Dutch Basketball League, the highest professional basketball league in the Netherlands. The regular season started on 7 October 2017 and ended 21 April 2018. Donar is the defending champion. The playoffs started on 1 May and ended 29 May 2018. Donar captured its seventh championship, its third in a row and fourth in fifth years, after defeating ZZ Leiden in the finals.

Teams

Den Helder Suns entered the DBL for this season, which meant the return of a teams from Den Helder since the departure of Kings three seasons ago. Starting from the 2017–18 season, BSW Weert was dissolved and replaced by BAL.

Arenas and locations
{| class="wikitable sortable"  
|-
! Club
! Location
! Venue
! Capacity
|-
| Apollo Amsterdam || Amsterdam || Apollohal  || align=center | 1,500
|-
| Aris Leeuwarden || Leeuwarden ||  Kalverdijkje || align=center | 1,700
|-
| BAL || Weert || Sporthal Boshoven || align=center | 1,000
|-
|  Den Helder Suns || Den Helder || Sporthal Sportlaan || align=center |1,000
|-
|  Donar || Groningen || MartiniPlaza  || align=center | 4,350
|-
|  Forward Lease Rotterdam || Rotterdam || Topsportcentrum || align=center | 1,000
|-
|  Landstede || Zwolle || Landstede Sportcentrum || align=center | 1,200
|-
|  New Heroes || 's-Hertogenbosch || Maaspoort  || align=center | 2,800
|-
|   Zorg en Zekerheid Leiden || Leiden || Vijf Meihal || align=center | 2,000
|}

Personnel and sponsorship

Managerial changes

Foreign players

For the 2017–18 season, league policy was changed and the number of allowed foreign players per team was increased from 4 to 5. Additional was the restriction that a team is not allowed to have five foreign players on the court at the same time.

Regular season
In the regular season, teams play against each other four times home-and-away in double a round-robin format. The six first qualified teams advance to the playoffs. The regular season started on 7 October 2017 and will end 21 April 2018.

Standings

Results

First round

Second round

Play-offs
In the quarterfinals a best-of-three format is used, while in the semifinals and finals are played in a best-of-seven format. The play-offs start on 1 May and ended 29 May 2018.

Bracket

Quarterfinals
The legs were played on 1 May, 3 May and (if necessary) on 5 May. The team with the higher seed played game one and three (if necessary) at home.

|}

Semifinals
The legs were played on 8 May, 10 May, 12 May, 15 May and (if necessary) 17 May, 19 May and 20 May. The team with the higher seed played game one, three, five and seven (if necessary) at home.

|}

Finals
The legs were played on 22 May, 24 May, 26 May, 29 May and (if necessary) 31 May, 2 June and 3 June. The team with the higher seed played game one, three, five and seven (if necessary) at home.

|}

Final standings
Teams are ranked based on the playoff round in which they were eliminated and their regular season records.

Awards

Statistics

Statistical leaders

In European competitions

Notes

See also
2017–18 NBB Cup
2017 Dutch Basketball Supercup

References

Dutch Basketball League seasons
1
Netherlands